All About You or All About U may refer to:

Film and television
 All About You (film), a 2001 American romantic comedy
 All About You (TV series), a 1970s American educational series
 All About You, a Philippine television series hosted by Miriam Quiambao

Music

Albums
 All About You (album), by Jeremih, 2010
 8701 (working title: All About U), by Usher, 2001

Songs
 "All About You" (The Knocks song), 2021
 "All About You" (Hilary Duff song), 2014
 "All About You" (Rolling Stones song), 1980
 "All About You" (Taeyeon song), 2019
 "All About You"/"You've Got a Friend", by McFly, 2005
 "All About You", by Against All Will from A Rhyme & Reason, 2009
 "All About You", by Enrique Iglesias from Final (Vol. 1), 2021
 "All About You", by Ideal from Ideal, 1999
 "All About You", by Josh Turner from Deep South, 2017
 "All About You", by Nik Kershaw from You've Got to Laugh, 2006
 "All About You", by SWV from I Missed Us, 2012
 "All About You", from the Bratz Rock Angelz film soundtrack, 2005
 "All About U", by Tupac Shakur from All Eyez on Me, 1996

See also 
 It's All About You (disambiguation)